Sound Tracks: Music Without Borders is a "musical adventure" — a music and travel series on PBS.  A one-hour pilot episode aired January 25, 2010, on PBS and a new episode premiered on October 5, 2012.  The show's website includes the streaming video of both episodes, plus additional video and music features.

A news magazine format show such as 60 Minutes, the show features three stories and a "global hit" music performance at the end. The latest episode stars Wynton Marsalis and his Jazz at Lincoln Center Orchestra, singer and human rights activist Youssou Ndour in Senegal, Scottish folk singer Julie Fowlis who performs the theme song for the Pixar/Disney animated movie Brave, and the Icelandic band Of Monsters and Men.

Marco Werman of public radio's "The World" is the host and lead reporter. Other reporters are Alexis Bloom, Arun Rath and Mirissa Neff. The executive producer is Stephen Talbot. Sound Tracks is a co-production of The Talbot Players in San Francisco and KQED, San Francisco. The pilot was done with Oregon Public Broadcasting. 

The 2010 pilot included a report about a Vladimir Putin pop propaganda song in Russia; a story about the late Afrobeat star, Fela Kuti, and his son, Seun Kuti, who is following in his father's musical and political footsteps; and how the controversy over the movie Borat led to the creation and performance of a symphony in Kazakhstan by composer Erran Baron Cohen (the brother of Borat actor Sacha Baron Cohen). The program concluded with a "global hit" song by the Portuguese fado star Mariza.

"Sound Tracks presents Quick Hits" is an online spinoff that showcased music videos and interviews each month on the PBS Arts website from 2010-2012. Featured "Quick Hits" artists have included Of Monsters and Men, Yuja Wang, Levon Helm, Anoushka Shankar, Milos Karadaglic, Hélène Grimaud, the Carolina Chocolate Drops, Jovanotti, Seu Jorge, KT Tunstall, Ozomatli, Meklit Hadero, Charles Bradley, Dengue Fever, and Seun Kuti, among others. It can be seen at pbs.org/arts and on the Sound Tracks Quick Hits YouTube Channel.

References

External links 
 "Sound Tracks: Music Without Borders". PBS Video website
 "Sound Tracks presents Quick Hits" website
 "Sound Tracks Quick Hits" YouTube Channel

PBS original programming